Three ships of the Royal Navy have been named HMS Orange Tree

  was a hoy captured in 1652 and sold in 1655.
  was a 6-gun fireship bought in 1672 and destroyed in an accidental fire in 1673.
  was a 30-gun fifth rate captured from Algerian forces in 1677. She was sold in 1687.

See also

References

Royal Navy ship names